Insensato Coração (Irrational Heart) is a Brazilian telenovela produced and broadcast by TV Globo that first premiered 17 January 2011, replacing Passione and ended on 19 August 2011, followed by Fina Estampa. It is created and written by Gilberto Braga and Ricardo Linhares in collaboration with Ângela Carneiro, Fernando Rebello, Izabel de Oliveira, João Ximenes Braga, Maria Helena Nascimento and Nelson Nadotti. Directed by Dennis Cavalho and Vinícius Coimbra together with Cristiano Marques, Flávia Lacerda, Maria de Médicis and Luísa Lima.

Starring Antonio Fagundes, Glória Pires, Eriberto Leão, Paolla Oliveira, Lázaro Ramos, Camila Pitanga, Gabriel Braga Nunes, Deborah Evelyn, Herson Capri, Deborah Secco, Juliano Cazarré, Ana Lúcia Torre, Natália do Vale, Nathalia Timberg and Tarcísio Meira.

Plot
Irrational Heart revolves around unreasonable attitudes and the consequences generated that threaten to change the course of many lives. This action filled, thrilling telenovela follows the fierce relationship of brothers Pedro and Leo Brandão.

Good-natured Pedro is a pilot who is engaged to be married but falls in love with Marina Drummond. They meet during the high jacking of a plane and together take control of the flight, allowing for a safe landing. In appreciation, Marina impulsively kisses Pedro, and they are instantly connected. But they are unaware that Marina is actually an old college friend of Pedro's fiancée, Luciana. When they find this out and decide to go separate ways an unpredictable series of events is unleashed.

Pedro faces a period of recovery after being tried and arrested for a crime that will not go unpunished and Marina must put her feelings on hold even after he is freed. Unlike his brother Pedro, Leo is unscrupulous and greedy. His perpetual envy for his brother causes him to make irrational choices that involve stealing, cheating, and kidnapping. To top it off, their mother, Wanda is extremely overprotective of Leo and makes foolish choices in her obsession for her son. But Pedro has underestimated just how clever and cunning his sibling can truly be.

Not only does the relentless Leo manage to edge aside his brother in the eyes of Marina, but he also succeeds in deceiving Norma, a naïve nurse who develops a genuine affection for him. He only keeps up the charade of their romance in a desperate bid to steal money from Norma’s boss. But after serving a jail sentence for a crime she didn’t commit, Norma will be driven by a strong desire for vengeance against Leo.

Before long, irrational actions transform two once-happy brothers into bitter rivals with Pedro demanding justice for Leo's misconduct.

Cast

 Glória Pires as Norma Pimentel Amaral
 Eriberto Leão as Pedro Alencar Brandão
 Paolla Oliveira as Marina Drummond Brandão
 Gabriel Braga Nunes as Leonardo Alencar Brandão (Léo / Armando / Fred / Wilson)
 Deborah Secco as Natalie Lamour (Natalie Batista Cortez)
 Herson Capri as Horácio Cortez
 Antônio Fagundes as Raul Brandão
 Camila Pitanga as Carolina Miranda (Carol)
 Lázaro Ramos as André Gurgel
 Natália do Vale as Wanda Brandão
 Deborah Evelyn as Eunice Alencar Machado
 Marcelo Valle as Júlio Machado
 Juliano Cazarré as Ismael Cunha
 Cristina Galvão as Jandira Mesquita
 Ana Lúcia Torre as Anita Brandão (Tia Neném)
 Nathalia Timberg as Vitória Drummond 
 Jonatas Faro as Rafael Cortez (Rafa)
 Bruna Linzmeyer as Leila Machado
 Giovanna Lancellotti as Cecília Machado
 Thiago Martins as Vinicius Rocha Amaral
 Maria Clara Gueiros as Abigail Castellani (Bibi)
 Ricardo Tozzi as Douglas Batista
 Isabela Garcia as Daisy Damasceno 
 Petrônio Gontijo as Roberto Fischer (Beto)
 Cássio Gabus Mendes as Kléber Damasceno
 Louise Cardoso as Sueli Brito Aboim
 Paloma Bernardi as Alice Miranda
 Tainá Müller as Paula Cortez
 Rodrigo Andrade as Eduardo Aboim
 Marcos Damigo as Hugo Abrantes
 Leonardo Miggiorin as Roni Fragonard
 Wendell Bendelack as Francisco Madureira (Xicão)
 Rosi Campos as Haidê Batista
 Bete Mendes as Zuleica Alencar
 José de Abreu as Milton Castelani
 Roberta Rodrigues as Fabíola dos Santos
 Guilherme Piva as Gabino Damasceno
 Ricardo Pereira as Henrique Taborda
 Luigi Baricelli as Oscar Amaral
 Helena Fernandes as Gilda Fischer Amaral
 Fernanda Paes Leme as Irene Brandão
 José Augusto Branco as Floriano Brandão
 Norma Blum as Olga Brandão
 Eduardo Galvão as Wagner Peixoto
 Leonardo Carvalho as Willian Sampaio
 Edson Fieschi as Nelson Mesquita
 André Barros as Zeca Peçanha
 Thiago de Los Reyes as Joaquim Garrido Marcondes de Almeida (Quim)
 Vítor Novello as Sérgio Fischer Amaral (Serginho)
 Polliana Aleixo as Olívia Damasceno
 Antônio Fragoso as Isidoro Brito
 Pedro Garcia Netto as Fernando Brandão (Nando)
 Carla Lamarca as Célia
 Andréa Dantas as Lídia
 Daniel Marques as José Paulo Assis (Zé Paulo)
 Cristiano Ximenes as Lucas Pereira Bastos
 Rita Porto as Zulmira
 Rogério Freitas as Dorival
 Carol Fazú as Ivone
 Márcio Alvarez as Marcos Camargo
 Guilherme Leme as Aquiles Trajano
 Cláudio Tovar as Borges
 Naruna Costa as Renata
 Nelson Diniz as Afrânio
 Marcos Otávio as Ivan
 Prazeres Barbosa as Amélia
 Beth Zalcman as Aparecida Garcia (Cida)
 Kiko Pissolato as Manolo
 Tarcísio Meira as Teodoro Amaral
 José Wilker as Umberto Brandão
 Fernanda Machado as Luciana Alencar
 Hugo Carvana as Olegário Silveira
 Tuca Andrada as Jonas Brito
 Nívea Maria as Carmem Santana
 Milton Gonçalves as Gregório Gurgel
 Cristiana Oliveira as Araci Laranjeira
 Lavínia Vlasak as Úrsula
 Ângela Vieira as Gisela Oliveira
 Vera Fischer as Catarina Diniz
 Maria Padilha as Marlene Valdez
 Tamara Taxman as Florinda

Cameo 

 Adriano Garib as Fonseca
 Aisha Jambo as Patrícia
 Alejandro Claveaux as Paulo
 Alexandra Martins as Matilde Lenísio
 Amanda Richter as Vera
 Amilton Monteiro as Dr. Moreira
 Ana Beatriz Nogueira as Clarice Cortez
 Ana Carbatti as Marlene Gurjel de Souza
 André Guerreiro as Figueiredo
 Anja Bittencourt as Neusa
 Antônio Karnewale as Clóvis 
 Arieta Corrêa as Darcy
 Beta Perez as Ana
 Bianca Byington as Dulce Petroni
 Bia Seidl as Helena
 Breno de Felippo as Bira
 Bruno Gradim as Dimas
 Bruno Torres as Valdir
 Cacau Hygino as Joel
 Cadu Fávero as Márcio
 Camilo Bevilacqua as Ernani
 Carlo Briani as Deputy Rubens Guimarães
 Carlos Fonte Boa as Antenor
 Carlos Vieira as Walter
 Carol Portes as Fernanda
 Carolina Holanda as Ísis
 Charles Möeller as Himself
 Cláudia Provedel as Jane
 Cláudio Botelho as Himself
 Cleiton Morais as Diogão
 Cristina Flores as Cláudia Malta
 Daniella Sarahyba as Herself
 Daniela Dinn as Thelma
 Daniel Del Sarto as Vicente
 Daniel Dalcin as Afonso
 Daniel Faleiros as Décio
 Daniel Jorge as Child Léo
 Daniel Rolim as Himself
 Dênis Derkian as Gomes
 Diego Cristo as Felipe Augusto Campos Melo
 Douglas Simon as Gustavo
 Dudu Azevedo as Neymar 
 Ed Oliveira as Rubens
 Edgard Amorim as Jorge
 Ellen Rocche as Ingrid Matos
 Elisa Lucinda as Vilma Miranda
 Felipe Massa as Himself
 Fernando Wellington as Dr. Siqueira
 Gero Pestalozzi as Fabiano Delamare
 Gilberto Marmorosch as Mendonça
 Gláucia Rodrigues as Claudete
 Giulio Lopes as Delegado Matos
 Herbert Richers Jr. as Ramirez (Aquiles's customer)
 Ildi Silva as Daniela
 Isaac Bernat as Emerson
 Isabel Fillardis as Marise
 Ivan Mendes as Renato
 Italo Sasso as Ney
 Jaqueline Farias as Herself
 Jéssika Alves as Vânia
 Johny Luz as Ciro
 Jonathan Azevedo as Lino
 José D'Artagnan Júnior as Reinaldo
 Juliana Terra as Rita Fonseca
 Júlio Levy as Gonzalez
 Karina Dohme as Jéssica
 Larissa Queiroz as Selma "Selminha" Macedo
 Leandra Leal as Adriana
 Luísa Friesi as Marisa
 Luiz Henrique Nogueira as Nicolas
 Leandro Lima as Patrick de Jesus
 Lidi Lisboa as Cátia
 Linn Jardim as Diana Chaves
 Luca de Castro as Tonico / Marcondes
 Luciano Quirino as Lutero
 Luiz Henrique Nogueira as Nicolas
 Manuela do Monte as Cíntia
 Marcelo Batista as Santos 
 Marcelo Capobiango as Adelmo
 Marcelo Laham as Marcelo
 Marcelo Várzea as Celso Tavares / Juca
 Márcia do Valle as Sônia
 Márcio Mariante as Noronha
 Marcos Acher as Chagas
 Marcos Otávio as Ivan
 Maria Carolina Ribeiro as Vivian
 Míriam Mehler as Lurdes
 Maria Melillo as Herself
 Marília Pêra as Herself
 Mariana Dubois as Denise
 Mário César Camargo as Getúlio Miranda
 Mário Hermeto as Gino
 Marise Gonçalves as Adelaide
 Marta Paret as Vanessa
 Maurício Silveira as Samuel
 Melissa Vettore as Bia Faissal
 Miguel Roncato as Gilvan dos Santos
 Monalisa Gomes as Suzana
 Murilo Grossi as Delegado Freitas
 Nathália Rodrigues as Andressa Pereira
 Nelson Diniz as Afrânio
 Ney Matogrosso as Himself
 Omar Docena as Cadú 
 Otto Jr. as Deputy Xavier
 Pablo Aguilar as Rogério
 Paula Possani as Mônica
 Paulo Giardini as Martins
 Paulo Reis as Newton
 Paulo Vespúcio as Andrade
 Rafael Sieg as Cícero Torres
 Raica Oliveira as Herself
 Renato Lobo as Dr. Sabino
 Ricardo Pavão as Deputy Marcos Rossi
 Ricardo Rathsam as Álvaro
 Roberta Foster as Tânia
 Roberto França as Robson
 Rodolfo Mesquita as Eduardo
 Rodrigo Rangel as Saldanha
 Roger Galera Flores as Himself
 Rubens Camelo as Inspector Tavares
 Sarah Maciel as Filha de Gisela 
 Samir Murad as Djalma
 Sérgio Monte as Clécio
 Sérgio Rufino as Apolônio
 Susanna Kruger as Diva
 Susana Ribeiro as Dalva 
 Tania Bôscoli as Zoraide
 Thais Botelho as Nina
 Thiago Rodrigues as Daniel
 Val Perré as Ivo
 Vânia Love as Lívia Live
 Vinícius Manne as Hélio
 Viviana Rocha as Cris
 Viviane Victorette as Jana
 Wesley Schunk as Himself
 Xando Graça as Valdemir Prudente
 Xuxa Lopes as Dolores
 Zemanuel Piñero as Alejandro
 Zé Victor Castiel as Werner Lindemberg

Ratings

References

External links
 Official website 
 

2011 Brazilian television series debuts
2011 Brazilian television series endings
2011 telenovelas
TV Globo telenovelas
Brazilian telenovelas
Brazilian LGBT-related television shows
Telenovelas by Gilberto Braga
Portuguese-language telenovelas
Television series about revenge